Giannis Vassiliou (Γιάννης Βασιλείου, born 1950 in Salamina) is a Greek Laïko singer. He released around two dozens of full-length albums, mostly on Alpha Records. Ten of his albums were certified Gold and one Platinum.
His son, Giorgos Alkaios, is also a successful singer.

Discography
1980 - Ακόμα τη θυμάμαι
1983 - Σ' αγαπώ καταλαβαίνεις
1984 - Με όλα τα χαρίσματα
1988 - Παραισθήσεις +1
1990 - Σαν να μην έφυγες ποτέ
1991 - Μια Βραδιά για Κέφι και Χορό 
1991 - Φήμες
1992 - Όλα θα στα Μάθω
1993 - Τη Λένε Λόλα
1994 - Έξαψη
1995 - Μαντήλι
1996 - Γιατί Μαλώνουμε
1997 - Να πας Κορίτσι μου
1998 - Λέει Λέει
1998 - Το Κάτι Άλλο
1999 - Είσαι Μωρό
1999 - Ούτε Ένα Βλέμμα
2000 - Είπα
2001 - Απόφαση Ζωής
2002 - Οι Χρυσές Επιτυχίες
2003 - Χαλάλι σου
2004 - Live
2005 - Με Καις με Καις
2006 - Το Καλύτερο Παιδί
2008 - Χωρίς Εσένα
2009 - Σπάστα όλα 
2011 - Με Αγάπη
2013 - Παίξε Μπάλα

Single
2013 - Δεν Μπορώ Να Σε Ξεχάσω
2014 - Γούστα
2014 - Ψεματάκια
2017 - Άλλον Αγαπάει
2017 - Θα Με Θυμάσαι
2018 - Έχω Σουξέ Μεγάλο
2019 - Μεθάω με έρωτα
2020 - Όλα στον αέρα
2021 - Μάγισσα
2021 - Πρέπει Να Αλλάξω Ουρανό
2022 - Τικ Τοκ
2022 - Μην Τον Πειράζεις Τον Τρελό

References

Living people
1950 births
20th-century Greek male singers
21st-century Greek male singers
People from Salamis Island